The genus Psychotria is one of the largest genera of flowering plants and contains 1582 species from the family Rubiaceae. Detailed, up to date information can be found on Psychotria in the World Checklist of Rubiaceae.

A 

Psychotria abdita Standl.
Psychotria aborensis Dunn
Psychotria abouabouensis (Schnell) Verdc.
Psychotria acicularis C.M.Taylor
Psychotria acreana K.Krause
Psychotria acuminata Benth.
Psychotria acuminatissima Elmer
Psychotria acunae Borhidi
Psychotria acutiflora DC.
Psychotria adafoana K.Schum.
Psychotria adamsonii Fosberg
Psychotria adderleyi Steyerm.
Psychotria adenophora Steyerm.
Psychotria adenophylla Wall.
Psychotria adpressipilis Steyerm.
Psychotria aegialodes (Bremek.) A.P.Davis & Govaerts
Psychotria aemulans K.Schum.
Psychotria aetantha (Sandwith) Steyerm.
Psychotria agamae Merr.
Psychotria aganosmifolia Craib
Psychotria agnata DC.
Psychotria aguilarii Standl. & Steyerm.
Psychotria alabatensis Sohmer & A.P.Davis
Psychotria alainii Acuña & Roíg
Psychotria alaotrensis Bremek.
Psychotria alatipes Wernham
Psychotria alba Ruiz & Pav.
Psychotria albicaulis Scott-Elliot
Psychotria albomarginata Hallier f.
Psychotria alegre ined.
Psychotria alemquerensis Huber
Psychotria alfaroana Standl.
Psychotria alibertioides Wernham
Psychotria allenii Standl.
Psychotria alloantha Steyerm.
Psychotria alluviorum K.Krause
Psychotria alpestris Urb. & Ekman
Psychotria alsophila K.Schum.
Psychotria alticola Steyerm.
Psychotria altiplanensis Standl. ex Steyerm.
Psychotria altsonii (Sandwith) Steyerm.
Psychotria alzapaniensis Sohmer & A.P.Davis
Psychotria amaracarpoides (Merr.) Merr.
Psychotria ambohimitombensis Bremek.
Psychotria ambongensis (Bremek.) A.P.Davis & Govaerts
Psychotria amboniana K.Schum.
Psychotria amieuensis Guillaumin
Psychotria amita Standl.
Psychotria ammericola Guillaumin
Psychotria amoena A.C.Sm.
Psychotria ampla Müll.Arg.
Psychotria amplectans Benth.
Psychotria amplifolia Raeusch.
Psychotria amplifrons Standl.
Psychotria amplissima Merr.
Psychotria amplithyrsa Valeton
Psychotria ampullacea A.C.Sm.
Psychotria anamallayana Bedd.
Psychotria anartiothrix Steyerm.
Psychotria ancaranensis (Bremek.) A.P.Davis & Govaerts
Psychotria anceps Kunth
Psychotria andaiensis Valeton
Psychotria andamanica Kurz
Psychotria andapae A.P.Davis & Govaerts
Psychotria andersonii Fosberg
Psychotria anderssoniana A.P.Davis & Govaerts
Psychotria andetrensis (Bremek.) A.P.Davis & Govaerts
Psychotria andevorantensis Bremek.
Psychotria andramontaensis A.P.Davis & Govaerts
Psychotria andriantiana A.P.Davis & Govaerts
Psychotria aneityensis Guillaumin
Psychotria anemothyrsa K.Schum. & K.Krause
Psychotria angulata Korth.
Psychotria angustata Andersson
Psychotria angustiflora K.Krause
Psychotria anisocephala Müll.Arg.
Psychotria anisopoda (Standl.) Steyerm.
Psychotria anjanaharibensis A.P.Davis & Govaerts
Psychotria anjouanensis A.P.Davis & Govaerts
Psychotria ankafinensis (K.Schum.) A.P.Davis & Govaerts
Psychotria ankasensis J.B.Hall
Psychotria antenniformis Steyerm.
Psychotria antsalovensis (Bremek.) A.P.Davis & Govaert
Psychotria antsirananensis A.P.Davis & Govaerts
Psychotria apiculata Müll.Arg.
Psychotria apocynifolia A.Gray
Psychotria apoda Steyerm.
Psychotria apodantha A.Gray
Psychotria apodocephala Standl.
Psychotria appendiculata Müll.Arg.
Psychotria appuniana Steyerm.
Psychotria aquatilis Merr. & L.M.Perry
Psychotria araguana Standl.
Psychotria araguariensis Steyerm.
Psychotria araiosantha A.C.Sm. & S.P.Darwin
Psychotria ararum C.M.Taylor
Psychotria arborea Hiern
Psychotria arborescens Elmer
Psychotria arbuscula Volkens
Psychotria arbutifolia (Baill.) Schltr.
Psychotria archboldiana Fosberg
Psychotria archboldii Sohmer
Psychotria ardisioides Craib
Psychotria arenosa Müll.Arg.
Psychotria areolata C.M.Taylor
Psychotria argantha A.C.Sm.
Psychotria argentata Korth.
Psychotria argentinensis Bacigalupo
Psychotria argoviensis Steyerm.
Psychotria arirambana Standl.
Psychotria aristeguietae Steyerm.
Psychotria arnoldiana De Wild.
Psychotria aroensis Steyerm.
Psychotria artensis (Montrouz.) Guillaumin
Psychotria articulata (Hiern) E.M.A.Petit
Psychotria asae (Kuntze) ined.
Psychotria ascendens Ridl.
Psychotria aschersoniana K.Schum. & K.Krause
Psychotria asekiensis Sohmer
Psychotria asiatica L.
Psychotria assimilis Bremek.
Psychotria atricaulis Fosberg
Psychotria atroviridis Ridl.
Psychotria aubletiana Steyerm.
Psychotria augagneurii Hochr.
Psychotria aurantibractea C.M.Taylor
Psychotria aurantiocarpa Fosberg
Psychotria aurea Lauterb.
Psychotria auriculata C.Wright ex Griseb.
Psychotria auxopoda E.M.A.Petit
Psychotria avenis Pancher ex Beauvis.
Psychotria aviculoides J.H.Kirkbr.
Psychotria avilensis Steyerm.
Psychotria axilliflora Merr. & L.M.Perry
Psychotria ayangannensis Steyerm.
Psychotria azuensis Alain

B 

Psychotria babatwoensis Cheek
Psychotria bagshawei E.M.A.Petit
Psychotria bahiensis DC.
Psychotria baillonii Schltr.
Psychotria bakeri Dwyer
Psychotria bakossiensis Cheek & Sonké
Psychotria balabacensis Merr.
Psychotria baladensis (Baill.) Guillaumin
Psychotria balakrishnii Deb & M.G.Gangop.
Psychotria balancanensis C.W.Ham.
Psychotria balansae Pit.
Psychotria balbisiana DC.
Psychotria balfouriana Verdc.
Psychotria baltenweckii Urb.
Psychotria banahaensis Elmer
Psychotria banaona Urb.
Psychotria bangii Rusby
Psychotria bangladeshica M.Gangop. & Chakrab.
Psychotria bangueyensis Merr.
Psychotria bangweana K.Schum.
Psychotria bantamensis Miq.
Psychotria barbatiloba Merr. & L.M.Perry
Psychotria barberi Gamble
Psychotria barensis K.Krause
Psychotria barkleyi Sohmer & A.P.Davis
Psychotria barnebyana Steyerm.
Psychotria baronii (Bremek.) A.P.Davis & Govaerts
Psychotria bataanensis Elmer
Psychotria batangana K.Schum.
Psychotria bathieana A.P.Davis & Govaerts
Psychotria baviensis Pit.
Psychotria bayombongensis Sohmer & A.P.Davis
Psychotria beaufortiensis Valeton ex Sohmer
Psychotria beddomei Deb & M.G.Gangop.
Psychotria bemarivensis A.P.Davis & Govaerts
Psychotria berizokae (Bremek.) A.P.Davis & Govaerts
Psychotria bermejalensis Britton
Psychotria bernardii Steyerm.
Psychotria berryi Wingf.
Psychotria berteroana DC.
Psychotria bertieroides Wernham
Psychotria beskeana Schltdl.
Psychotria betamponensis (Bremek.) A.P.Davis & Govaerts
Psychotria beyrichiana Müll.Arg.
Psychotria bhargavae M.Gangop. & Chakrab.
Psychotria bialata C.Wright ex Griseb.
Psychotria biaristata Bartl. ex DC.
Psychotria biaurita (Hutch. & Dalziel) Verdc.
Psychotria bidentata (Thunb. ex Schult.) Hiern
Psychotria bifaria Hiern
Psychotria bimbiensis Bridson & Cheek
Psychotria birchiana King & Gamble
Psychotria birotula L.B.Sm. & Downs
Psychotria bisulcata Wight & Arn.
Psychotria blakei Standl. & Steyerm.
Psychotria blepharophora (Standl.) Steyerm.
Psychotria bodenii Wernham
Psychotria boenyana (Bremek.) A.P.Davis & Govaerts
Psychotria bogotensis Standl.
Psychotria boholensis Merr. ex Sohmer & A.P.Davis
Psychotria boivinii Bremek.
Psychotria bolivarensis (Standl. & Steyerm.) Steyerm.
Psychotria boloboensis Valeton
Psychotria bonii Pit.
Psychotria boninensis Nakai
Psychotria bontocensis Merr.
Psychotria boqueronensis Wernham
Psychotria boquetensis Dwyer
Psychotria boraginoides (Dwyer) C.M.Taylor
Psychotria borjensis Kunth
Psychotria bostrychothyrsus Sandwith
Psychotria botryocephala (Standl.) Steyerm.
Psychotria bourailensis Guillaumin
Psychotria boyanii Steyerm.
Psychotria brachiata Sw.
Psychotria brachyandra Müll.Arg.
Psychotria brachyantha Hiern
Psychotria brachyanthema Standl.
Psychotria brachyanthoides De Wild.
Psychotria brachyblastus A.P.Davis & Govaerts
Psychotria brachyceras Müll.Arg.
Psychotria brachygyne Müll.Arg.
Psychotria brachylaena (Baill.) Guillaumin
Psychotria brachypoda (Müll.Arg.) Britton
Psychotria brachythrix A.C.Sm.
Psychotria brackenridgei A.Gray
Psychotria bracteocardia (DC.) Müll.Arg.
Psychotria bradei Standl.
Psychotria brandneriana (L.Linden) Robbr.
Psychotria brassii Hiern
Psychotria brazaoi Steyerm.
Psychotria bremekampiana Steyerm.
Psychotria brevicalyx Fosberg
Psychotria brevicaulis K.Schum.
Psychotria brevicollis Müll.Arg.
Psychotria breviflora (Schltdl.) Müll.Arg.
Psychotria brevipaniculata De Wild.
Psychotria brevipedunculata Müll.Arg.
Psychotria brevipes DC.
Psychotria brevipuberula E.M.A.Petit
Psychotria brevistipula Urb.
Psychotria bridsoniae A.P.Davis & Govaerts
Psychotria brieyi De Wild.
Psychotria bristolii Whistler
Psychotria broweri Seem.
Psychotria brucei Verdc.
Psychotria brunnea Schweinf. ex Hiern
Psychotria brunnescens Craib
Psychotria bryonicola Proctor
Psychotria buchii Urb.
Psychotria buchtienii (H.J.P.Winkl.) Standl.
Psychotria bugoyensis K.Krause
Psychotria bukaensis De Wild.
Psychotria bulilimontis W.N.Takeuchi
Psychotria bullata Seem.
Psychotria bullulata Bremek.
Psychotria buntingii Steyerm.
Psychotria burkillii Deb & M.G.Gangop.
Psychotria burmanica Deb & M.G.Gangop.
Psychotria butayei De Wild.
Psychotria butibumensis Sohmer
Psychotria byrsonimifolia Acuña & Roíg

C 

Psychotria cabuyarensis Wernham
Psychotria cadigensis Merr.
Psychotria caerulea Ruiz & Pav.
Psychotria cagayanensis Merr.
Psychotria cajambrensis Standl. ex Steyerm.
Psychotria calceata E.M.A.Petit
Psychotria calciphila Steyerm.
Psychotria calderi Deb & M.G.Gangop.
Psychotria callensii E.M.A.Petit
Psychotria calliantha (Baill.) Guillaumin
Psychotria callithrix (Miq.) Steyerm.
Psychotria calocardia Standl.
Psychotria calocarpa Kurz
Psychotria calochlamys Standl.
Psychotria calophylla Standl.
Psychotria calorhamnus (Baill.) Ruhsam
Psychotria calothyris (Bremek.) A.P.Davis & Govaerts
Psychotria calothyrsa (Baill.) Guillaumin
Psychotria calycosa A.Gray
Psychotria cambodiana Pierre ex Pit.
Psychotria camerunensis E.M.A.Petit
Psychotria camptodroma Merr. & L.M.Perry
Psychotria camptopus Verdc.
Psychotria campyloneura Müll.Arg.
Psychotria campyloneuroides (Standl.) C.M.Taylor
Psychotria campylopoda Standl.
Psychotria canalensis (Baill.) Guillaumin
Psychotria canarensis Talbot
Psychotria candelabrum Standl.
Psychotria canescens Steyerm.
Psychotria cantleyi Ridl.
Psychotria capensis (Eckl.) Vatke
Psychotria capillacea (Müll.Arg.) Standl.
Psychotria capitata Ruiz & Pav.
Psychotria capitulifera Merr. & L.M.Perry
Psychotria capizensis Merr.
Psychotria capuronii A.P.Davis & Govaerts
Psychotria caquetensis Steyerm.
Psychotria cardenasii Standl.
Psychotria cardiochlamys (Baill.) Schltr.
Psychotria cardiomorpha C.M.Taylor & A.Pool
Psychotria cardiophylla Merr.
Psychotria carnea (G.Forst.) A.C.Sm.
Psychotria carnosocarpa Dwyer & M.V.Hayden
Psychotria carronis C.Moore & F.Muell.
Psychotria carstensensis Wernham
Psychotria carthagenensis Jacq.
Psychotria cascajalensis C.W.Ham.
Psychotria casiguraensis Sohmer & A.P.Davis
Psychotria casiquiaria Müll.Arg.
Psychotria castaneifolia E.M.A.Petit
Psychotria castaneopila Merr.
Psychotria castellana Müll.Arg.
Psychotria castroi Merr. & Quisumb. ex Sohmer & A.P.Davis
Psychotria catanduaniensis Sohmer & A.P.Davis
Psychotria catetensis (Hiern) E.M.A.Petit
Psychotria cathetoneura Urb.
Psychotria caudata M.Gomes
Psychotria cauligera C.M.Taylor
Psychotria celebica Miq.
Psychotria celiae Steyerm.
Psychotria cenepensis C.M.Taylor
Psychotria cephalidantha K.Schum.
Psychotria cephaloides A.P.Davis & Govaerts
Psychotria cephalophora Merr.
Psychotria ceratalabastron K.Schum.
Psychotria ceratantha Standl.
Psychotria cernua Nadeaud
Psychotria ceronii C.M.Taylor
Psychotria cerrocoloradensis Dwyer ex C.M.Taylor
Psychotria cerronis Steyerm.
Psychotria chagrensis Standl.
Psychotria chalconeura (K.Schum.) E.M.A.Petit
Psychotria chamelaensis C.M.Taylor & Dominguez-Lic.
Psychotria chaponiana Standl.
Psychotria chartacea Craib
Psychotria chasaliifolia Pit.
Psychotria chaunantha K.Schum. & Lauterb.
Psychotria cheathamiana Fosberg
Psychotria chimboracensis Standl.
Psychotria chiriquiensis (Standl.) C.M.Taylor
Psychotria chiriquina Standl.
Psychotria chitariana Dwyer & C.W.Ham.
Psychotria chlorobotrya Standl.
Psychotria chlorocalyx K.Schum.
Psychotria chlorophylla Müll.Arg.
Psychotria chocoana C.M.Taylor
Psychotria chonantha (Gilli) Sohmer
Psychotria chondrophylla (Miq.) Boerl.
Psychotria choriophylla Standl.
Psychotria christarusselliae Sohmer & A.P.Davis
Psychotria christii Urb.
Psychotria christophersenii Whistler
Psychotria chrysantha Merr. & L.M.Perry
Psychotria chrysanthoides Sohmer
Psychotria chrysocarpa Merr. & L.M.Perry
Psychotria ciliolata Schltdl.
Psychotria cinerea De Wild.
Psychotria clarendonensis Urb.
Psychotria clavipes Müll.Arg.
Psychotria clementis Britton & P.Wilson
Psychotria clivorum Standl. & Steyerm.
Psychotria closterocarpa A.Gray
Psychotria clusioides Proctor
Psychotria cocosensis C.W.Ham.
Psychotria coelocalyx Urb.
Psychotria coeloneura Urb.
Psychotria coelospermum F.M.Bailey
Psychotria collina Labill.
Psychotria colnettiana Guillaumin
Psychotria colorata (Willd. ex Schult.) Müll.Arg.
Psychotria comorensis Bremek.
Psychotria comperei E.M.A.Petit
Psychotria compta Standl.
Psychotria comptonii S.Moore
Psychotria concinna Oliv.
Psychotria concolor Benth. & Oerst.
Psychotria condensa King & Gamble
Psychotria condensata Valeton
Psychotria condorensis Pierre ex Pit.
Psychotria conephoroides (Rusby) C.M.Taylor
Psychotria confertiloba A.C.Sm.
Psychotria congesta Spreng. ex DC.
Psychotria conglobata Valeton
Psychotria conglobatioides Sohmer
Psychotria conglomeratiflora Sohmer & A.P.Davis
Psychotria conjugens Müll.Arg.
Psychotria connata Wall.
Psychotria conocarpa Bremek.
Psychotria consanguinea Müll.Arg.
Psychotria contracta Müll.Arg.
Psychotria convergens C.M.Taylor
Psychotria cookei J.W.Moore
Psychotria cooperi Standl.
Psychotria copeensis De Wild.
Psychotria coptosperma (Baill.) Guillaumin
Psychotria cordata A.Gray
Psychotria cordatula Merr.
Psychotria cordobensis C.M.Taylor
Psychotria cornejoi C.M.Taylor
Psychotria cornifer Wernham
Psychotria cornigera Benth.
Psychotria correae (Dwyer & M.V.Hayden) C.M.Taylor
Psychotria corymbosa Sw.
Psychotria costata (Rusby) Standl.
Psychotria costatovenosa Schltdl.
Psychotria costivenia Griseb.
Psychotria costularia (Baill.) Standl. & Steyerm.
Psychotria cotejensis (Standl.) J.H.Kirkbr.
Psychotria coursii Bremek.
Psychotria coussareoides Standl.
Psychotria crassicalyx K.Krause
Psychotria crassiflora Fosberg
Psychotria crassifolia Miq.
Psychotria crassipedunculata Sohmer
Psychotria crassipetala E.M.A.Petit
Psychotria crassiramula Sohmer
Psychotria crebrinervia Valeton
Psychotria crispipila Merr.
Psychotria cristalensis Urb.
Psychotria croatii (Dwyer) C.M.Taylor
Psychotria croceovenosa Dwyer
Psychotria crocochlamys Sandwith
Psychotria croftiana Sohmer
Psychotria cryptogrammata E.M.A.Petit
Psychotria cuatrecasasii (Standl. & Steyerm.) C.M.Taylor
Psychotria cuernosensis Elmer
Psychotria cumanensis Humb. & Bonpl. ex Schult.
Psychotria cuneata Elmer
Psychotria cuneifolia DC.
Psychotria cuprea Ridl.
Psychotria cupularis (Müll.Arg.) Standl.
Psychotria cupulata Valeton
Psychotria cuspidata Bredem. ex Schult.
Psychotria cuspidella Miq.
Psychotria cuspidulata (K.Krause) Standl.
Psychotria cutucuana C.M.Taylor
Psychotria cyanococca Seem. ex Dombrain
Psychotria cyanopharynx K.Schum.
Psychotria cyathicalyx E.M.A.Petit
Psychotria cyclophylla Urb.
Psychotria cylindrostipula Merr.
Psychotria cypellantha Steyerm.

D 

Psychotria daguensis Standl.
Psychotria dallachiana Benth.
Psychotria dalzellii Hook.f.
Psychotria damasiana Sohmer
Psychotria damnatorum Guillaumin
Psychotria daphnoides A.Cunn. ex Hook.
Psychotria darwiniana Cheek
Psychotria dasyophthalma Griseb.
Psychotria debilis Müll.Arg.
Psychotria decaryi Bremek.
Psychotria declieuxioides S.Moore
Psychotria decolor Drake ex Bremek.
Psychotria decora Standl.
Psychotria decorifolia S.Moore
Psychotria decumbens (Bremek.) A.P.Davis & Govaerts
Psychotria deflexa DC.
Psychotria defretesiana (W.N.Takeuchi) W.N.Takeuchi
Psychotria deneversii C.M.Taylor
Psychotria densa W.C.Chen
Psychotria densicostata Müll.Arg.
Psychotria densifolia Stapf
Psychotria densinervia (K.Krause) Verdc.
Psychotria densivenosa Müll.Arg.
Psychotria denticulata Wall.
Psychotria deplanchei (Beauvis.) Guillaumin
Psychotria dermatophylla (K.Schum.) E.M.A.Petit
Psychotria deverdiana Guillaumin
Psychotria dichroa (Standl.) C.M.Taylor
Psychotria diegoae Borhidi
Psychotria dieniensis Merr. & L.M.Perry
Psychotria diffusa Merr.
Psychotria diffusiflora A.C.Sm.
Psychotria dimorphophylla K.Schum.
Psychotria dingalanensis Sohmer & A.P.Davis
Psychotria diospyrifolia Kaneh.
Psychotria diplococca Lauterb. & K.Schum.
Psychotria diploneura (K.Schum.) Bridson & Verdc.
Psychotria dipteropodioides Sohmer
Psychotria direpta Wernham
Psychotria distichodoma (Bremek.) A.P.Davis & Govaerts
Psychotria distinctinervia A.P.Davis & Govaerts
Psychotria divergens Blume
Psychotria diversinodula (Verdc.) Verdc.
Psychotria dives (Standl.) C.M.Taylor
Psychotria djumaensis De Wild.
Psychotria dodoensis K.Krause
Psychotria dolichantha Urb.
Psychotria dolichocalyx Urb. & Ekman
Psychotria dolichosepala Merr. & L.M.Perry
Psychotria dolphiniana Urb.
Psychotria domatiata C.D.Adams
Psychotria dorotheae Wernham
Psychotria dressleri (Dwyer) C.W.Ham.
Psychotria dubia (Wight) Alston
Psychotria duckei Standl.
Psychotria dudleyi Steyerm.
Psychotria duidana Standl.
Psychotria dunstervilleorum Steyerm.
Psychotria dura Griseb.
Psychotria duricoria Standl. & Steyerm.
Psychotria durilancifolia Dwyer
Psychotria dwyeri C.W.Ham.

E 

Psychotria ealaensis De Wild.
Psychotria earlei Urb.
Psychotria ebensis K.Schum.
Psychotria ebracteata Urb.
Psychotria eciliata Steyerm.
Psychotria ectasiphylla K.Schum. & Lauterb.
Psychotria edentata A.C.Sm.
Psychotria educta Standl.
Psychotria egensis Müll.Arg.
Psychotria eggersii Standl.
Psychotria ekmanii Urb.
Psychotria elachistantha (K.Schum.) E.M.A.Petit
Psychotria elegans Ridl.
Psychotria elliotii Bremek.
Psychotria ellipsoidea Craib
Psychotria elliptica (Kunth) Humb. & Bonpl. ex Schult.
Psychotria elliptifolia Elmer
Psychotria elliptilimba Merr.
Psychotria elmeri Merr.
Psychotria elmeriana Hochr.
Psychotria elongatosepala (De Wild.) E.M.A.Petit
Psychotria embirensis Steyerm.
Psychotria eminiana (Kuntze) E.M.A.Petit
Psychotria enanilihensis Bremek.
Psychotria erectiloba Guillaumin
Psychotria ernestii K.Krause
Psychotria erratica Hook.f.
Psychotria erythrocarpa Schltdl.
Psychotria erythrocephala (K.Schum. & K.Krause) Standl.
Psychotria erythropus K.Schum.
Psychotria esmeraldana C.M.Taylor
Psychotria euaensis M.Hotta
Psychotria eumorphanthus Fosberg
Psychotria euneura Miq.
Psychotria evansensis A.C.Sm.
Psychotria evenia C.Wright ex Griseb.
Psychotria everardii Wernham
Psychotria evrardiana E.M.A.Petit
Psychotria exannulata Müll.Arg.
Psychotria exellii R.Alves, Figueiredo & A.P.Davis
Psychotria exigua (F.M.Bailey) Domin
Psychotria exilis A.C.Sm.
Psychotria expansa Blume
Psychotria expansissima K.Schum.
Psychotria exsculpta S.Moore
Psychotria extensa Miq.

F 

Psychotria faguetii (Baill.) Schltr.
Psychotria falcata Rusby
Psychotria fanshawei (Standl.) Steyerm.
Psychotria farameoides Bremek.
Psychotria faucicola K.Schum.
Psychotria fauriei (H.Lév.) Fosberg
Psychotria febrifuga Poepp.
Psychotria felsspitziensis Valeton
Psychotria fendleri Standl.
Psychotria fenicis Merr.
Psychotria ferdinandi-muelleri Guillaumin
Psychotria fernandopoensis E.M.A.Petit
Psychotria fertitensis Schweinf. ex Verdc.
Psychotria filipes A.Gray
Psychotria fimbriatifolia R.D.Good
Psychotria fimbricalyx (Miq.) Boerl.
Psychotria fimbriflora Steyerm.
Psychotria fissistipula Müll.Arg.
Psychotria fitzalanii Benth.
Psychotria flava Oerst. ex Standl.
Psychotria flavens Standl.
Psychotria flavida Talbot
Psychotria flaviflora (K.Krause) C.M.Taylor
Psychotria flaviramula Sohmer
Psychotria flaviventer Wernham
Psychotria fleuryana E.M.A.Petit
Psychotria fleuryi Pit.
Psychotria florencei Lorence & W.L.Wagner
Psychotria florentina (Standl. ex Steyerm.) ined.
Psychotria floribunda Kunth
Psychotria fluminensis Vell.
Psychotria fluviatilis Chun ex W.C.Chen
Psychotria foetens Sw.
Psychotria foetida Griseb.
Psychotria foliosa Hiern
Psychotria foremanii Sohmer
Psychotria formosa Cham. & Schltdl.
Psychotria formosissima Steyerm.
Psychotria forsteriana A.Gray
Psychotria fortuita Standl.
Psychotria fosbergii Steyerm.
Psychotria fosteri C.W.Ham.
Psychotria foxworthyi Sohmer & A.P.Davis
Psychotria fractinervata E.M.A.Petit
Psychotria fractistipula L.B.Sm., R.M.Klein & Delprete
Psychotria fragrans (Gillespie) Fosberg
Psychotria frakei Sohmer & A.P.Davis
Psychotria franchetiana (Drake) Drake
Psychotria franquevilleana Müll.Arg.
Psychotria fraseri Ridl.
Psychotria fraterna Müll.Arg.
Psychotria friburgensis Standl.
Psychotria frodinii Sohmer
Psychotria frondosa S.Moore
Psychotria fruticetorum Standl.
Psychotria fuertesii Urb.
Psychotria fulvoidea King & Gamble
Psychotria furcans Fosberg
Psychotria fuscescens Craib
Psychotria fuscopilosa Schltr.
Psychotria fusiformis C.M.Taylor

G 

Psychotria gabonica Hiern
Psychotria gaboonensis Ruhsam
Psychotria gabrieliae (Baill.) Guillaumin
Psychotria gabrielis Müll.Arg.
Psychotria gagneorum Lorence & W.L.Wagner
Psychotria gaitalensis C.M.Taylor
Psychotria galeottiana (M.Martens) C.M.Taylor & Lorence
Psychotria galintanensis Sohmer & A.P.Davis
Psychotria gallerana Standl.
Psychotria galorei Sohmer
Psychotria garberiana Christoph.
Psychotria garciae Standl.
Psychotria gardneri Hook.f.
Psychotria gawadacephaelis Wernham
Psychotria geminodens K.Schum.
Psychotria gendarussifolia Blume
Psychotria gentryi (Dwyer) C.M.Taylor
Psychotria geophylax Cheek & Sonké
Psychotria geronensis Urb.
Psychotria gibbsiae S.Moore
Psychotria gigantopus K.Schum.
Psychotria gillespieana A.C.Sm.
Psychotria gilletii De Wild.
Psychotria giluwensis Sohmer
Psychotria gitingensis Elmer
Psychotria gjellerupii A.P.Davis
Psychotria glabra (Turrill) Fosberg
Psychotria glabrata Sw.
Psychotria glandulicalyx Steyerm.
Psychotria glandulifera Thwaites ex Hook.f.
Psychotria glandulosa (Dennst.) Suresh
Psychotria glaucifolia A.P.Davis & Govaerts
Psychotria glaziovii Müll.Arg.
Psychotria globicephala Gamble
Psychotria globiceps K.Schum.
Psychotria globosa Hiern
Psychotria glomerulata (Donn.Sm.) Steyerm.
Psychotria gneissica S.Moore
Psychotria goetzei (K.Schum.) E.M.A.Petit
Psychotria goldmanii Standl.
Psychotria goniocarpa (Baill.) Guillaumin
Psychotria gonzalagunioides J.H.Kirkbr.
Psychotria goodenoughiensis Sohmer
Psychotria goodii Figueiredo
Psychotria gossweileri E.M.A.Petit
Psychotria goyazensis Müll.Arg.
Psychotria gracilenta Müll.Arg.
Psychotria gracilior A.C.Sm.
Psychotria gracilipes Merr.
Psychotria graminifolia Urb.
Psychotria grandiflora H.Mann
Psychotria grandis Sw.
Psychotria grandistipula Merr.
Psychotria grandistipulata (Lauterb.) Whistler
Psychotria grantii Fosberg
Psychotria granulata Urb. & Ekman
Psychotria granvillei Steyerm.
Psychotria grayana K.Schum.
Psychotria greeneana Urb.
Psychotria greenwelliae Fosberg
Psychotria griffithii Hook.f.
Psychotria griseifolia S.Moore
Psychotria griseola K.Schum.
Psychotria grumilia (Kuntze) E.M.A.Petit
Psychotria guanchezii Steyerm.
Psychotria guapilensis (Standl.) Hammel
Psychotria guaremalensis Standl.
Psychotria guerkeana K.Schum.
Psychotria guineensis E.M.A.Petit
Psychotria gundlachii Urb.
Psychotria gyrulosa Stapf

H 

Psychotria hainanensis H.L.Li
Psychotria haitiensis Urb.
Psychotria halophiloides Wernham
Psychotria hamiltoniana C.M.Taylor
Psychotria hammelii Dwyer
Psychotria hanoverensis Proctor
Psychotria haplantha Bremek.
Psychotria harmandii Pit.
Psychotria hastisepala Müll.Arg.
Psychotria hathewayi Fosberg
Psychotria haumugaensis Sohmer
Psychotria hawaiiensis (A.Gray) Fosberg
Psychotria hazenii Standl.
Psychotria hebecarpa Merr. & L.M.Perry
Psychotria hebeclada DC.
Psychotria hedyotifolia Merr.
Psychotria helferiana Kurz
Psychotria hellwigiensis Valeton ex Sohmer
Psychotria hemicephaelis Wernham
Psychotria hemsleyi Verdc.
Psychotria hendersoniana Craib
Psychotria henryana Murugan & Gopalan
Psychotria henryi H.Lév.
Psychotria hentyi Sohmer
Psychotria herrerana C.M.Taylor
Psychotria herzogii S.Moore
Psychotria heterocephala Müll.Arg.
Psychotria heterochroa Urb.
Psychotria heteromorpha Korth.
Psychotria heteroneura Steyerm.
Psychotria heterophylla Merr. & L.M.Perry
Psychotria heterosticta E.M.A.Petit
Psychotria hexandra H.Mann
Psychotria hidalgensis Borhidi
Psychotria hierniana Exell
Psychotria hilonghilongensis Sohmer & A.P.Davis
Psychotria himanthophylla Bremek.
Psychotria hirsuta Sw.
Psychotria hirsuticalyx (R.D.Good) Figueiredo
Psychotria hirtinervia Wawra
Psychotria hispidula Standl. ex Steyerm.
Psychotria hivaoana Fosberg
Psychotria hobdyi Sohmer
Psychotria hoffmannseggiana (Willd. ex Schult.) Müll.Arg.
Psychotria hollandiae Valeton
Psychotria holoxantha Urb. & Ekman
Psychotria holstii ined.
Psychotria holtonii Standl.
Psychotria holtzii (K.Schum.) E.M.A.Petit
Psychotria homalosperma A.Gray
Psychotria hombroniana (Baill.) Fosberg
Psychotria homolleae Bremek.
Psychotria horizontalis Sw.
Psychotria hornitensis Dwyer & C.W.Ham.
Psychotria horsfieldiana Miq.
Psychotria hosokawae Fosberg
Psychotria hospitalis Standl.
Psychotria howcroftii W.N.Takeuchi
Psychotria huampamiensis C.M.Taylor
Psychotria huantensis Standl.
Psychotria humbertii Bremek.
Psychotria humblotii (Bremek.) A.P.Davis & Govaerts
Psychotria humboldtiana (Cham.) Müll.Arg.
Psychotria humilis Hiern
Psychotria hunteri (Horne ex Baker) A.C.Sm.
Psychotria hyalina Steyerm.
Psychotria hylocharis Standl.
Psychotria hypargyraea A.Gray
Psychotria hypochlorina C.M.Taylor
Psychotria hypoleuca K.Schum.
Psychotria hyptoides Benth.

I 

Psychotria ianthina Guillaumin
Psychotria ibitipocae Standl.
Psychotria ignea Müll.Arg.
Psychotria ihuensis Merr. & L.M.Perry
Psychotria ilendensis K.Krause
Psychotria ilocana (Merr.) Merr.
Psychotria imerinensis (Bremek.) A.P.Davis & Govaerts
Psychotria impercepta A.C.Sm. & S.P.Darwin
Psychotria impressinervia Merr.
Psychotria imthurniana Oliv.
Psychotria imthurnii Turrill
Psychotria inaequalis King & Gamble
Psychotria inaequifolia Müll.Arg.
Psychotria incompta A.C.Sm.
Psychotria inconspicua Merr. & L.M.Perry
Psychotria induta Craib
Psychotria infundibularis Hiern
Psychotria infundibulifera Setch.
Psychotria ingentifolia E.M.A.Petit
Psychotria insignis Standl.
Psychotria insolens Standl.
Psychotria insueta (Dwyer) C.W.Ham.
Psychotria insularum A.Gray
Psychotria integristipulata A.P.Davis & Govaerts
Psychotria interior ined.
Psychotria intermedia Gardner
Psychotria interstans Domin
Psychotria intrudens Miq.
Psychotria iodotricha Müll.Arg.
Psychotria iridensis Sohmer & A.P.Davis
Psychotria iringensis Verdc.
Psychotria irosinensis Elmer
Psychotria irwinii Steyerm.
Psychotria isalensis (Bremek.) A.P.Davis & Govaerts
Psychotria iteophylla Stapf
Psychotria ituriensis De Wild. ex E.Petit
Psychotria ivakoanyensis Bremek.
Psychotria iwahigensis Elmer
Psychotria ixoroides Bartl. ex DC.

J 

Psychotria jambosioides Schltdl.
Psychotria jamesoniana Standl.
Psychotria japurensis Müll.Arg.
Psychotria jasminoides Standl.
Psychotria jauaensis Steyerm.
Psychotria jefensis Dwyer ex C.M.Taylor
Psychotria jervisei (Standl.) C.M.Taylor
Psychotria jimenezii Standl.
Psychotria jinotegensis C.Nelson & al.
Psychotria johnsii Sohmer
Psychotria johnsonii Hook.f.
Psychotria juarezana C.M.Taylor & Lorence
Psychotria juddii Christoph.
Psychotria jugalis A.C.Sm.
Psychotria juninensis Standl.

K 

Psychotria kaduana (Cham. & Schltdl.) Fosberg
Psychotria kahuziensis E.M.A.Petit
Psychotria kaieteurensis Sandwith
Psychotria kairoana Sohmer
Psychotria kajewskii Merr. & L.M.Perry
Psychotria kamialii W.N.Takeuchi
Psychotria kaniensis Valeton
Psychotria kaoensis A.C.Sm.
Psychotria karemaensis Sohmer
Psychotria katikii Sohmer
Psychotria kelelensis Valeton
Psychotria keralensis Deb & M.G.Gangop.
Psychotria kerrii Govaerts
Psychotria keyensis Warb.
Psychotria kikwitensis De Wild.
Psychotria kilimandscharica K.Schum. ex Engl.
Psychotria killipii Standl.
Psychotria kimuenzae De Wild.
Psychotria kirkii Hiern
Psychotria kitsonii Hutch. & Dalziel
Psychotria klainei Schnell
Psychotria klossii Craib
Psychotria klugii Standl.
Psychotria kochii Valeton
Psychotria konguensis Hiern
Psychotria koniamboensis Guillaumin
Psychotria koroiveibaui A.C.Sm.
Psychotria korthalsiana Miq.
Psychotria kosraensis Lorence & K.R.Wood
Psychotria kratensis Craib
Psychotria krukovii Standl.
Psychotria kuhlmannii Standl.
Psychotria kumbangii Ruhsam
Psychotria kunstleri King & Gamble
Psychotria kupensis Cheek
Psychotria kuruvolii A.C.Sm.
Psychotria kurzii Deb & M.G.Gangop.
Psychotria kwewonii Jongkind

L 

Psychotria laciniata Vell.
Psychotria lagunensis (Merr.) Merr.
Psychotria lamarinensis C.W.Ham.
Psychotria lanaensis (Merr.) Merr.
Psychotria lanceifolia K.Schum.
Psychotria lanceolaria Ridl.
Psychotria lancilimba Merr.
Psychotria langbianensis Wernham
Psychotria laselvensis C.W.Ham.
Psychotria lasiantha Schltr. & K.Krause
Psychotria lasianthifolia Valeton
Psychotria lasianthoides Valeton
Psychotria lasiocephala Ridl.
Psychotria lasiophthalma Griseb.
Psychotria lasiopus Müll.Arg.
Psychotria lasiostylis Müll.Arg.
Psychotria latistipula Benth.
Psychotria laui Merr. & F.P.Metcalf
Psychotria lauracea (K.Schum.) E.M.A.Petit
Psychotria laurentii De Wild.
Psychotria lavanchiei Bremek.
Psychotria lawrancei Standl.
Psychotria laxiflora Blume
Psychotria laxissima S.Moore
Psychotria le-ratii Guillaumin
Psychotria lebrunii Cheek
Psychotria lecomtei Pit.
Psychotria ledermannii (K.Krause) Figueiredo
Psychotria leiantha Steyerm.
Psychotria leilae A.P.Davis & Govaerts
Psychotria leiocarpa Cham. & Schltdl.
Psychotria leiophloea Merr. & L.M.Perry
Psychotria leiophylla Merr. & L.M.Perry
Psychotria leitana C.M.Taylor
Psychotria leleana Sohmer
Psychotria leleanoides Sohmer
Psychotria lenormandii Schltr.
Psychotria leonardiana E.M.A.Petit
Psychotria leonardii Merr. & L.M.Perry
Psychotria leonis Britton & P.Wilson
Psychotria lepida Standl.
Psychotria lepidocalyx S.Moore
Psychotria lepidocarpa Korth.
Psychotria leptantha A.C.Sm.
Psychotria leptophylla Hiern
Psychotria leptothyrsa Miq.
Psychotria letestui (De Wild.) ined.
Psychotria letouzeyi E.M.A.Petit
Psychotria leucantha Schltr. & K.Krause
Psychotria leucocalyx A.C.Sm.
Psychotria leucocarpa Blume
Psychotria leucocentron K.Schum.
Psychotria leucococca K.Schum. & Lauterb.
Psychotria leucopoda E.M.A.Petit
Psychotria levis (Standl.) C.M.Taylor
Psychotria levuensis Gillespie
Psychotria lianoides Elmer
Psychotria liberica Hepper
Psychotria liesneri Dwyer
Psychotria ligustrifolia (Northr.) Millsp.
Psychotria limba Scott-Elliot
Psychotria limitanea Standl.
Psychotria limonensis K.Krause
Psychotria lindenii Standl.
Psychotria linderi Hepper
Psychotria lindleyana Müll.Arg.
Psychotria linearifolia Bremek.
Psychotria linearis Bartl. ex DC.
Psychotria linearisepala E.M.A.Petit
Psychotria lineolata Craib
Psychotria liogieri Steyerm.
Psychotria loefgrenii Standl.
Psychotria loheri Elmer
Psychotria lokohensis Bremek.
Psychotria lolokiensis S.Moore
Psychotria longicauda Valeton
Psychotria longicuspis Müll.Arg.
Psychotria longipaniculata Sohmer
Psychotria longipedicellata Elmer
Psychotria longipetiolata Thwaites
Psychotria longirostrata Valeton
Psychotria longirostris (Rusby) Standl.
Psychotria longissima Quisumb. & Merr.
Psychotria longituba A.Chev. ex De Wild.
Psychotria loniceroides Sieber ex DC.
Psychotria lopezii Acuña & Roíg
Psychotria lorenciana C.M.Taylor
Psychotria lorentzii Valeton
Psychotria louisii E.M.A.Petit
Psychotria lourteigiana Steyerm.
Psychotria lovettii Borhidi & Verdc.
Psychotria lozadae Borhidi & Lorea-Hern.
Psychotria lubutuensis De Wild.
Psychotria lucens Hiern
Psychotria lucidifolia Standl.
Psychotria lucidula Baker
Psychotria lunanii Urb.
Psychotria lundellii Standl.
Psychotria lupulina Benth.
Psychotria lutea (Aubl.) Willd.
Psychotria luteola Merr. & L.M.Perry
Psychotria lutescens Craib
Psychotria luxurians Rusby
Psychotria luzoniensis (Cham. & Schltdl.) Fern.-Vill.
Psychotria lyciiflora (Baill.) Schltr.
Psychotria lycioides (Baill.) Guillaumin

M 

Psychotria macbridei Standl.
Psychotria macgregorii Merr.
Psychotria macrocalyx A.Gray
Psychotria macrocarpa Hook.f.
Psychotria macrochlamys (Bremek.) A.P.Davis & Govaerts
Psychotria macroglossa (Baill.) Guillaumin
Psychotria macroserpens Fosberg
Psychotria madulidii Sohmer & A.P.Davis
Psychotria mafuluensis S.Moore
Psychotria magnasepala Sohmer
Psychotria magnifica (Gillespie) Fosberg
Psychotria magnifolia Merr.
Psychotria magnisepala Bremek.
Psychotria maguireorum Steyerm.
Psychotria mahonii C.H.Wright
Psychotria maingayi Hook.f.
Psychotria malacorrhax (Lauterb. & K.Schum.) Valeton
Psychotria malaloensis Merr. & L.M.Perry
Psychotria malaneoides Müll.Arg.
Psychotria malaspinae Merr.
Psychotria malayana Jack
Psychotria malchairii De Wild.
Psychotria maleolens Urb.
Psychotria maliensis Schnell
Psychotria malmei (Standl.) Zappi
Psychotria mamillaris Müll.Arg.
Psychotria manambolensis A.P.Davis & Govaerts
Psychotria manampanihensis (Bremek.) A.P.Davis & Govaerts
Psychotria manaraeana Steyerm.
Psychotria manausensis Steyerm.
Psychotria mandiocana Müll.Arg.
Psychotria mandrarensis (Bremek.) A.P.Davis & Govaerts
Psychotria mangenotii (Aké Assi) Verdc.
Psychotria mangorensis (Bremek.) A.P.Davis & Govaerts
Psychotria manillensis Bartl. ex DC.
Psychotria maningoryensis A.P.Davis & Govaerts
Psychotria manna Urb.
Psychotria mannii Hiern
Psychotria manongarivensis A.P.Davis & Govaerts
Psychotria mapiriensis Standl.
Psychotria mapourioides DC.
Psychotria marafungaensis Sohmer
Psychotria maranhana Müll.Arg.
Psychotria marauensis Fosberg & Florence
Psychotria marcgraviella Standl.
Psychotria marchionica Drake
Psychotria marginata Sw.
Psychotria mariana Bartl. ex DC.
Psychotria maricaensis Urb.
Psychotria mariguidonensis Sohmer & A.P.Davis
Psychotria mariniana (Cham. & Schltdl.) Fosberg
Psychotria marmeladensis Urb.
Psychotria maroensis (Bremek.) A.P.Davis & Govaerts
Psychotria marojejensis Bremek.
Psychotria martinetugei Cheek
Psychotria martiusii Müll.Arg.
Psychotria matagalpensis C.M.Taylor
Psychotria matambuaii W.N.Takeuchi
Psychotria mathewsii Standl.
Psychotria maturacensis Steyerm.
Psychotria mauiensis Fosberg
Psychotria mayana W.N.Takeuchi
Psychotria mazaruniensis Standl.
Psychotria medusula Müll.Arg.
Psychotria meeboldii Deb & M.G.Gangop.
Psychotria megacarpa Ridl.
Psychotria megacephala Steyerm.
Psychotria megacoma Miq.
Psychotria megalocalyx Müll.Arg.
Psychotria megalocarpa (Bremek.) A.P.Davis & Govaerts
Psychotria megalopus Verdc.
Psychotria megistantha E.M.A.Petit
Psychotria megistophylla Standl.
Psychotria mekongensis Pit.
Psychotria melaneoides Wernham
Psychotria melanocarpa Merr. & L.M.Perry
Psychotria melanotricha Müll.Arg.
Psychotria melintangensis Govaerts
Psychotria membranifolia Bartl. ex DC.
Psychotria menalohensis (Bremek.) A.P.Davis & Govaerts
Psychotria mendozii Sohmer & A.P.Davis
Psychotria meridensis Steyerm.
Psychotria merrilliana Sohmer
Psychotria merrillii Kaneh.
Psychotria merrittii Merr.
Psychotria merrittioides Sohmer & A.P.Davis
Psychotria mesentericarpa Baker
Psychotria mexiae Standl.
Psychotria miae A.P.Davis & Govaerts
Psychotria micheliae (J.-G.Adam) Jongkind & W.D.Hawth.
Psychotria micheliana J.-G.Adam
Psychotria micralabastra (Lauterb. & K.Schum.) Valeton
Psychotria micrantha Kunth
Psychotria microbotrys Ruiz ex Standl.
Psychotria microcarpa Müll.Arg.
Psychotria micrococca (Lauterb. & K.Schum.) Valeton
Psychotria microglossa (Baill.) Baill. ex Guillaumin
Psychotria microgrammata Bremek.
Psychotria micromyrtus (Baill.) Schltr.
Psychotria microthyrsa E.M.A.Petit
Psychotria milnei (A.Gray) K.Schum.
Psychotria mima Standl.
Psychotria minarum Standl. & Steyerm.
Psychotria mindanaensis Merr.
Psychotria mindoroensis Elmer
Psychotria mineirensis Wernham
Psychotria miniata Merr. & L.M.Perry
Psychotria minima R.D.Good
Psychotria minimicalyx K.Schum.
Psychotria minuta E.M.A.Petit
Psychotria minutiflora Müll.Arg.
Psychotria minutifoveolata Merr.
Psychotria miombicola Verdc.
Psychotria mirandae C.W.Ham.
Psychotria misolensis Valeton ex Sohmer
Psychotria molinae Standl.
Psychotria molinarum Lorence
Psychotria molleri K.Schum.
Psychotria mollipes K.Krause
Psychotria monanthos (Baill.) Schltr.
Psychotria monensis Cheek & Séné
Psychotria moninensis (Hiern) E.M.A.Petit
Psychotria monocarpa Fosberg
Psychotria monopedicellata Sohmer
Psychotria mons-mi Ruhsam
Psychotria monsalveae C.M.Taylor
Psychotria montana Blume
Psychotria montensis Moore
Psychotria monteverdensis Dwyer & C.W.Ham.
Psychotria monticola Kurz
Psychotria montisgiluwensis A.P.Davis & Ruhsam
Psychotria montisstellaris (P.Royen) A.P.Davis & Ruhsam
Psychotria montivaga C.M.Taylor
Psychotria moonii Hook.f.
Psychotria morindiflora Wall. ex Hook.f.
Psychotria morindoides Hutch.
Psychotria morley-smithiae A.P.Davis & Govaerts
Psychotria mornicola Urb.
Psychotria morobensis Sohmer
Psychotria mortehanii De Wild.
Psychotria mortoniana Standl.
Psychotria moseskemei Cheek
Psychotria moyobambana Standl.
Psychotria muellerdomboisii W.N.Takeuchi
Psychotria muelleriana Wawra
Psychotria multicapitata King & Gamble
Psychotria multicostata Valeton
Psychotria multinervia Ridl.
Psychotria multipedunculata Sohmer
Psychotria multiplex Müll.Arg.
Psychotria mumfordiana F.Br.
Psychotria munda Standl.
Psychotria murmurensis Sohmer
Psychotria muschleriana K.Krause
Psychotria muscicola Valeton
Psychotria muscosa (Jacq.) Steyerm.
Psychotria mwinilungae Verdc.
Psychotria mycetoides Valeton
Psychotria myriantha Müll.Arg.
Psychotria myrmecophila K.Schum. & Lauterb.
Psychotria myrsinoides Merr. & L.M.Perry
Psychotria myrtiphyllum Sw.

N 

Psychotria nacdado Guillaumin
Psychotria nagapatensis Merr.
Psychotria naguana Urb.
Psychotria namwingensis Govaerts
Psychotria nandarivatensis A.C.Sm.
Psychotria nanifrutex Sohmer
Psychotria nathaliae (Baill.) Guillaumin
Psychotria nautensis Standl.
Psychotria nebulosa K.Krause
Psychotria negrosensis Elmer
Psychotria neillii C.W.Ham. & Dwyer
Psychotria nekouana (Baill.) Guillaumin
Psychotria nematostachya Steyerm.
Psychotria nemorosa Gardner
Psychotria nervosa Sw.
Psychotria nesophila F.Muell.
Psychotria neurothrix Müll.Arg.
Psychotria ngollengollei Cheek
Psychotria nicobarica Kurz
Psychotria nieuwenhuizii Valeton
Psychotria nigerica Hepper
Psychotria nigra (Gaertn.) Alston
Psychotria nigropunctata Hiern
Psychotria nilgiriensis Deb & M.G.Gangop.
Psychotria nitens (Merr.) Merr.
Psychotria nivea (Sandwith) Steyerm.
Psychotria niveobarbata (Müll.Arg.) Britton
Psychotria njumei Cheek
Psychotria nodiflora O.Lachenaud & D.J.Harris
Psychotria norae Steyerm.
Psychotria nossibensis A.P.Davis & Govaerts
Psychotria novohiberiensis Sohmer
Psychotria noxia A.St.-Hil.
Psychotria nubica Delile
Psychotria nubicola G.Taylor
Psychotria nubiphila Dwyer
Psychotria nuda (Cham. & Schltdl.) Wawra
Psychotria nudiceps Standl.
Psychotria nudiflora Wight & Arn.
Psychotria nummularioides Guillaumin
Psychotria nymannii ined.

O 

Psychotria oaxacensis Borhidi & Salas-Mor.
Psychotria obconica Müll.Arg.
Psychotria obliquinervia Müll.Arg.
Psychotria oblita Wernham
Psychotria oblonga (DC.) Steyerm.
Psychotria obovalis A.Rich.
Psychotria obovatifolia De Wild.
Psychotria obscura Zoll. & Moritzi
Psychotria obscurinervia Merr.
Psychotria obtegens Müll.Arg.
Psychotria obtusifolia Lam. ex Poir.
Psychotria occidentalis Steyerm.
Psychotria ochroleuca Standl.
Psychotria octocuspis Müll.Arg.
Psychotria octosulcata Talbot
Psychotria odorata C.Wright ex Griseb.
Psychotria officinalis (Aubl.) Raeusch. ex Sandwith
Psychotria oinochrophylla (Standl.) C.M.Taylor
Psychotria oleandrella (Standl.) C.M.Taylor
Psychotria oleifolia (Kunth) Standl.
Psychotria oleoides (Baill.) Schltr.
Psychotria olgae Dwyer & M.V.Hayden
Psychotria oligocarpa K.Schum.
Psychotria oligoneura Pierre ex Pit.
Psychotria olivacea Valeton
Psychotria oliveri Lorence & W.L.Wagner
Psychotria olsenii Sohmer & A.P.Davis
Psychotria ombrophila (Schnell) Verdc.
Psychotria oncocarpa K.Schum.
Psychotria onivensis (Bremek.) A.P.Davis & Govaerts
Psychotria oocarpa Bremek.
Psychotria opaca Müll.Arg.
Psychotria opima Standl.
Psychotria oreadum S.Moore
Psychotria oreophila Guillaumin
Psychotria oreotrephes (Bremek.) A.P.Davis & Govaerts
Psychotria orgyalis Merr. & L.M.Perry
Psychotria orophila E.M.A.Petit
Psychotria orosiana Standl.
Psychotria orosioides C.M.Taylor
Psychotria osaensis C.M.Taylor
Psychotria osiana W.N.Takeuchi & Pipoly
Psychotria ossaeana Urb.
Psychotria ostreophora (Wernham) C.M.Taylor
Psychotria ottonis Standl.
Psychotria ouatilouensis Guillaumin
Psychotria oubatchensis Schltr.
Psychotria ovatistipula C.M.Taylor
Psychotria ovoidea Wall. ex Hook.f.
Psychotria owariensis (P.Beauv.) Hiern
Psychotria ownbeyi Standl. ex C.M.Taylor

P 

Psychotria pachyantha A.C.Sm.
Psychotria pachygrammata Bremek.
Psychotria pachyphylla (King & Gamble) Ridl.
Psychotria pachythalla Urb.
Psychotria pacifica K.Schum.
Psychotria pacimonica Müll.Arg.
Psychotria pacorensis C.W.Ham.
Psychotria paeonia C.M.Taylor
Psychotria pakaraimensis Steyerm.
Psychotria palawanensis Elmer
Psychotria palimlimensis Sohmer & A.P.Davis
Psychotria pallens Gardner
Psychotria pallescens (Rusby) Standl.
Psychotria pallida Valeton
Psychotria pallidifolia Merr.
Psychotria paloensis Elmer
Psychotria paludicola Merr. & L.M.Perry
Psychotria paludosa Müll.Arg.
Psychotria palustris E.M.A.Petit
Psychotria panamensis Standl.
Psychotria panayensis Merr.
Psychotria pancheri (Baill.) Schltr.
Psychotria pandensis Standl.
Psychotria pandurata Verdc.
Psychotria papantlensis (Oerst.) Hemsl.
Psychotria papillata (Merr.) Merr.
Psychotria papillosa Guillaumin
Psychotria papuana (Wernham) H.St.John
Psychotria paracalensis Sohmer & A.P.Davis
Psychotria paradichroa C.M.Taylor
Psychotria paradoxalis (Bremek.) A.P.Davis & Govaerts
Psychotria paramaracarpus (Baill.) Schltr.
Psychotria paravillosa C.M.Taylor
Psychotria pariensis Steyerm.
Psychotria parimensis Steyerm.
Psychotria parkeri Baker
Psychotria parvibractea Steyerm.
Psychotria parvifolia Benth.
Psychotria parvistipulata E.M.A.Petit
Psychotria parvula A.Gray
Psychotria patens Sw.
Psychotria patentinervia Müll.Arg.
Psychotria patentivenia Miq.
Psychotria patulinervia Merr. & Quisumb. ex Sohmer & A.P.Davis
Psychotria pauciflora Bartl. ex DC.
Psychotria paucinervia Merr.
Psychotria paulina Standl.
Psychotria pavairiensis Sohmer
Psychotria pearcei Standl.
Psychotria pebasensis (Standl.) C.M.Taylor
Psychotria pectinata Steyerm.
Psychotria peduncularis (Salisb.) Steyerm.
Psychotria pedunculata Sw.
Psychotria peekeliana Valeton
Psychotria penangensis Hook.f.
Psychotria pendula Hook.f.
Psychotria penduliflora Ridl.
Psychotria pentaphtosa Müll.Arg.
Psychotria perbrevis K.Schum.
Psychotria perferruginea Steyerm.
Psychotria pergamena Korth.
Psychotria perijaensis Steyerm.
Psychotria pernitida Urb.
Psychotria perotensis Cast.-Campos
Psychotria perrieri Bremek.
Psychotria pervicax Standl.
Psychotria pervillei Baker
Psychotria peteri E.M.A.Petit
Psychotria petiginosa Brenan
Psychotria petiolosa Valeton
Psychotria petitii Verdc.
Psychotria phaeochlamys (Lauterb. & K.Schum.) Valeton
Psychotria phaeochlamysioides Sohmer
Psychotria phanerandra (Standl. & Steyerm.) C.M.Taylor & Lorence
Psychotria phaneroloma Standl. & Steyerm.
Psychotria phanerophlebia Merr.
Psychotria phaneroplexa Standl.
Psychotria philacra Dwyer
Psychotria philippensis Cham. & Schltdl.
Psychotria phyllanthoides Schltr. ex Guillaumin
Psychotria phyllocalymma Müll.Arg.
Psychotria phyllocalymmoides Müll.Arg.
Psychotria pichisensis Standl.
Psychotria pickeringii A.Gray
Psychotria pilifera Hutch.
Psychotria pilosa Ruiz & Pav.
Psychotria pilosella Elmer
Psychotria pilulifera King & Gamble
Psychotria pinetorum Urb.
Psychotria pininsularis Guillaumin
Psychotria pinnatinervia Elmer
Psychotria piolampra K.Schum.
Psychotria piperi Merr.
Psychotria piresii Steyerm.
Psychotria pisonioides Standl.
Psychotria pittosporifolia Fosberg
Psychotria plana Craib
Psychotria plantaginoidea E.M.A.Petit
Psychotria platycocca A.Gray
Psychotria platyneura Kurz
Psychotria platypoda DC.
Psychotria pleeana Urb.
Psychotria pleiocephala Müll.Arg.
Psychotria pleuropoda Donn.Sm.
Psychotria plicata Urb.
Psychotria plocamipes Wernham
Psychotria plumeriifolia Elmer
Psychotria plumieri Urb.
Psychotria pluriceps Standl.
Psychotria pluricostata (Standl.) C.M.Taylor
Psychotria plurivenia Thwaites
Psychotria plusiantha Standl.
Psychotria pocsii Borhidi & Verdc.
Psychotria podantha (Fosberg) A.C.Sm.
Psychotria podocarpa E.M.A.Petit
Psychotria poilanei Pit.
Psychotria poissoniana (Baill.) Guillaumin
Psychotria poliostemma Benth.
Psychotria polita Valeton
Psychotria polycarpa (Miq.) Hook.f.
Psychotria polycephala Benth.
Psychotria polygrammata Bremek.
Psychotria polymorpha Greuter
Psychotria polyphylla Bremek.
Psychotria polytricha Miq.
Psychotria ponce-leonis Acuña & Roíg
Psychotria pongoana Standl.
Psychotria porphyroclada K.Schum.
Psychotria potamophila K.Schum.
Psychotria potanthera Wernham
Psychotria potaroensis (Sandwith) Steyerm.
Psychotria praecox Valeton ex Sohmer
Psychotria prainii H.Lév.
Psychotria prancei Steyerm.
Psychotria principensis G.Taylor
Psychotria prismoclavata (Fosberg) A.C.Sm.
Psychotria pritchardii Seem.
Psychotria prunifolia (Kunth) Steyerm.
Psychotria pseudinundata Wernham
Psychotria pseudoaxillaris (Wernham) ined.
Psychotria pseudocollina Hochr.
Psychotria pseudoixora Pit.
Psychotria pseudomaschalodesme W.N.Takeuchi
Psychotria pseudomicrodaphne Guillaumin
Psychotria pseudoplatyphylla E.M.A.Petit
Psychotria psittacina Steyerm.
Psychotria psychotriifolia (Seem.) Standl.
Psychotria psychotrioides (DC.) Roberty
Psychotria pteropus O.Lachenaud & D.J.Harris
Psychotria puberulenta Steyerm.
Psychotria puberulina (Müll.Arg.) Standl.
Psychotria pubescens Sw.
Psychotria pubiflora (A.Gray) Fosberg
Psychotria pubilimba Quisumb.
Psychotria pubinoda Standl. ex Steyerm.
Psychotria pubituba S.Moore
Psychotria pueboensis Ruhsam
Psychotria pulchrebracteata Guillaumin
Psychotria pulgarensis Sohmer & A.P.Davis
Psychotria pullei Bremek.
Psychotria pulleniana Sohmer
Psychotria pumila Hiern
Psychotria punctata Vatke
Psychotria pungens Steyerm.
Psychotria purariensis Sohmer
Psychotria purdiaei Urb.
Psychotria purpurea Merr. & L.M.Perry
Psychotria puyoana C.M.Taylor
Psychotria pygmaea Merr.
Psychotria pygmaeodendron K.Schum.
Psychotria pyramidalis Griseb.
Psychotria pyramidata Elmer
Psychotria pyrrotricha (Bremek.) A.P.Davis & Govaerts

Q 

Psychotria quadribracteata Steyerm.
Psychotria quindiensis Standl.
Psychotria quinqueradiata Pol.
Psychotria quisumbingiana Sohmer & A.P.Davis

R 

Psychotria rabeniana Müll.Arg.
Psychotria racemosa Rich.
Psychotria radicans (Merr.) Merr.
Psychotria raiateensis J.W.Moore
Psychotria raivavaensis Fosberg
Psychotria rakotonasoloi A.P.Davis & Govaerts
Psychotria rakotoniaina A.P.Davis & Govaerts
Psychotria ramadecumbens Sohmer
Psychotria rambouensis De Wild.
Psychotria ramiflora Rusby
Psychotria ramosii Merr.
Psychotria ramosissima Elmer
Psychotria ramuensis Sohmer
Psychotria ramulosa Merr. & L.M.Perry
Psychotria randiana Merr. & L.M.Perry
Psychotria rapensis F.Br.
Psychotria rarifolia S.Moore
Psychotria ratovoarisonii A.P.Davis & Govaerts
Psychotria rauwolfioides Standl.
Psychotria recordiana Standl.
Psychotria rectinervis Urb.
Psychotria recurva Hiern
Psychotria reducta Baker
Psychotria reflexapedunculata Sohmer
Psychotria refracta Müll.Arg.
Psychotria refractiflora K.Schum.
Psychotria reginae Müll.Arg.
Psychotria reineckei K.Schum.
Psychotria remota Benth.
Psychotria repanda Ruiz & Pav.
Psychotria reptans Benth.
Psychotria resurrecta Wernham
Psychotria reticulata Ruiz & Pav.
Psychotria reticulatissima S.Moore
Psychotria reticulosa Valeton
Psychotria retifera Standl.
Psychotria retiphlebia Baker
Psychotria retusa (Bremek.) A.P.Davis & Govaerts
Psychotria revoluta DC.
Psychotria reynosoi Sohmer & A.P.Davis
Psychotria rhinocerotis Reinw. ex Blume
Psychotria rhizomatosa De Wild.
Psychotria rhodothamna Standl.
Psychotria rhodotricha Pit.
Psychotria rhombibracteata C.M.Taylor & M.T.Campos
Psychotria rhombocarpa Kaneh.
Psychotria rhombocarpoides Hosok.
Psychotria rhonhofiae K.Krause
Psychotria rhytidocarpa Müll.Arg.
Psychotria richardiana Urb.
Psychotria ridleyi King & Gamble
Psychotria rigescens Standl.
Psychotria rigidifolia (Elmer) Merr.
Psychotria rimbachii Standl.
Psychotria rivularis Urb.
Psychotria robertii Standl.
Psychotria robusta Blume
Psychotria romolerouxiana C.M.Taylor
Psychotria rondeletioides Standl.
Psychotria rondonii Delprete
Psychotria rosacea Steyerm.
Psychotria rosea (Benth.) Müll.Arg.
Psychotria roseata (Fosberg) A.C.Sm.
Psychotria rosella (Bremek.) A.P.Davis & Govaerts
Psychotria roseotincta S.Moore
Psychotria rosmarinifolia (Baill.) Schltr.
Psychotria rosseliensis Sohmer
Psychotria rostrata Blume
Psychotria rosulatifolia Dwyer
Psychotria rotensis Kaneh.
Psychotria roxburghii DC.
Psychotria rubefacta (S.Moore) Guillaumin
Psychotria rubiginosa Elmer ex Merr.
Psychotria rubiginosissima Wernham
Psychotria rubripilis K.Schum.
Psychotria rubristipulata R.D.Good
Psychotria rubropedicellata (Bremek.) A.P.Davis & Govaerts
Psychotria rubropilosa De Wild.
Psychotria rudis Ridl.
Psychotria ruelliifolia (Cham. & Schltdl.) Müll.Arg.
Psychotria rufidula Standl.
Psychotria rufipes Hook.f.
Psychotria rufipilis A.Chev. ex De Wild.
Psychotria rufiramea Standl.
Psychotria rufocalyx Fosberg
Psychotria rufovaginata Griseb.
Psychotria rufovillosa (Bremek.) A.P.Davis & Govaerts
Psychotria rugulosa Kunth
Psychotria ruhsamiana A.P.Davis & Govaerts
Psychotria ruiz-teranii Steyerm.
Psychotria ruizii Standl.
Psychotria rupestris Müll.Arg.
Psychotria rupicola (Baill.) Schltr.
Psychotria russellii Deb & M.G.Gangop.
Psychotria rutila Craib

S 

Psychotria sacciformis C.M.Taylor
Psychotria sadebeckiana K.Schum.
Psychotria sagittalis (Baill.) Guillaumin
Psychotria saidoriensis Sohmer
Psychotria sakaleonensis Bremek.
Psychotria salentana Standl.
Psychotria saloiana Diels
Psychotria saltatrix C.M.Taylor
Psychotria saltiensis (S.Moore) Guillaumin
Psychotria salzmanniana Müll.Arg.
Psychotria samarensis Merr.
Psychotria sambiranensis Bremek.
Psychotria sambucina Link ex Schult.
Psychotria samoana K.Schum.
Psychotria sanblasensis C.M.Taylor
Psychotria sanchezii C.M.Taylor
Psychotria sanfelicensis Dwyer
Psychotria sangeana (Miq.) Merr.
Psychotria sanluisensis Steyerm.
Psychotria santae-rosae Standl.
Psychotria santamartensis Rusby
Psychotria santaremica Müll.Arg.
Psychotria sarapiquensis Standl.
Psychotria sarcocarpa Merr.
Psychotria sarcodes Merr. & L.M.Perry
Psychotria sarmentosa Blume
Psychotria sarmentosoides Valeton
Psychotria sarmiensis Sohmer
Psychotria sastrei Steyerm.
Psychotria sauvallei Urb.
Psychotria savaiiensis Rech.
Psychotria scaberula Merr.
Psychotria scabrida Bremek.
Psychotria scabrifolia Rusby
Psychotria schaeferi Lorence & W.L.Wagner
Psychotria scheffleri K.Schum. & K.Krause
Psychotria schlechtendaliana (Müll.Arg.) Müll.Arg.
Psychotria schlechteriana K.Krause
Psychotria schliebenii E.M.A.Petit
Psychotria schlimii Standl.
Psychotria schmielei Warb.
Psychotria schnellii (Aké Assi) Verdc.
Psychotria schomburgkii Benth.
Psychotria schraderoides (K.Krause) C.M.Taylor
Psychotria schultzei Valeton
Psychotria schumanniana Schltr.
Psychotria schunkeana (Standl.) C.M.Taylor
Psychotria schunkei C.M.Taylor
Psychotria schweinfurthii Hiern
Psychotria scitula A.C.Sm.
Psychotria sclerocarpa Whistler
Psychotria scortechinii King & Gamble
Psychotria scytophylla Bremek.
Psychotria secundiflora Valeton
Psychotria sellowiana (DC.) Müll.Arg.
Psychotria semifissa Müll.Arg.
Psychotria semperflorens Pancher ex Beauvis.
Psychotria sempervirens Geddes
Psychotria sentanensis Valeton
Psychotria serpens L.
Psychotria setistipula Ridl.
Psychotria setistipulata (R.D.Good) E.M.A.Petit
Psychotria setulifera C.M.Taylor
Psychotria shaferi Urb.
Psychotria sibuyanensis Elmer
Psychotria siccorubra Dwyer
Psychotria sidamensis Cufod.
Psychotria silhetensis Hook.f.
Psychotria silhouettae F.Friedmann
Psychotria silvae Steyerm.
Psychotria silvicola Müll.Arg.
Psychotria simianensis A.P.Davis & Govaerts
Psychotria simiarum Standl.
Psychotria simmondsiana F.M.Bailey
Psychotria sinuata C.M.Taylor
Psychotria sipapoensis Steyerm.
Psychotria siphonophora Urb.
Psychotria sixaolensis C.W.Ham.
Psychotria sloanei Urb.
Psychotria smaragdina Standl.
Psychotria smithiae Geddes
Psychotria sodiroi Standl.
Psychotria soejartoi C.M.Taylor
Psychotria sogerensis Wernham
Psychotria sohmeri Kiehn
Psychotria sohmeriana I.M.Turner
Psychotria sohotonensis Sohmer & A.P.Davis
Psychotria solanoides Turrill
Psychotria solitudinum Standl.
Psychotria solomonensis Merr. & L.M.Perry
Psychotria sonkeana O.Lachenaud & Séné
Psychotria sonocorova (Bremek.) A.P.Davis & Govaerts
Psychotria sordida Thwaites
Psychotria sororia DC.
Psychotria sorsogonensis Elmer
Psychotria soteropolitana Müll.Arg.
Psychotria sousae Lorence & Dwyer
Psychotria spadicea (Pittier) Standl. & Steyerm.
Psychotria sparsipila Bremek.
Psychotria spathacea (Hiern) Verdc.
Psychotria spathicalyx Müll.Arg.
Psychotria speciosa G.Forst.
Psychotria spectabilis Steyerm.
Psychotria speluncae Standl. & Steyerm.
Psychotria sphaerocarpa Wall.
Psychotria sphaerocephala Müll.Arg.
Psychotria sphaeroidea Urb.
Psychotria sphaerothyrsa Valeton
Psychotria spicata Benth.
Psychotria spiciflora Standl.
Psychotria spithamea S.Moore
Psychotria squamelligera Steyerm.
Psychotria srilankensis Ruhsam
Psychotria st-johnii Fosberg
Psychotria stachyoides Benth.
Psychotria steinbachii Standl.
Psychotria steinii Steyerm.
Psychotria stellaris Müll.Arg.
Psychotria stenantha A.C.Sm.
Psychotria stenocalyx Müll.Arg.
Psychotria stenostachya Standl.
Psychotria stevedarwiniana W.N.Takeuchi
Psychotria stevensiana Sohmer
Psychotria steyermarkii Standl.
Psychotria stigmatophylla K.Schum.
Psychotria stipulosa Müll.Arg.
Psychotria stolonifera W.N.Takeuchi
Psychotria storckii Seem.
Psychotria straminea Hutch.
Psychotria streimannii Sohmer
Psychotria stricta K.Schum.
Psychotria strictistipula Schnell
Psychotria strigosa Müll.Arg.
Psychotria striolata K.Krause
Psychotria suarezensis A.P.Davis & Govaerts
Psychotria suaveolens S.Moore
Psychotria subacuminalis Müll.Arg.
Psychotria subalata C.Wright ex Griseb.
Psychotria subalpina Elmer
Psychotria subcapitata Bremek.
Psychotria subcaudata Valeton
Psychotria subcordata Britton
Psychotria subcucullata Merr.
Psychotria subfusca Müll.Arg.
Psychotria subglabra De Wild.
Psychotria subintegra (Wight & Arn.) Hook.f.
Psychotria submontana Domin
Psychotria subnubila Bremek.
Psychotria subobliqua Hiern
Psychotria subobovata Miq.
Psychotria subpallens S.Moore
Psychotria subpunctata Hiern
Psychotria subremota Müll.Arg.
Psychotria subscandens Müll.Arg.
Psychotria subsessiliflora Elmer
Psychotria subsimplex Merr.
Psychotria subspathacea Müll.Arg.
Psychotria subspathulata (Müll.Arg.) C.M.Taylor
Psychotria subtriflora Müll.Arg.
Psychotria subundulata Benth.
Psychotria subuniflora (Baill.) Schltr.
Psychotria subvelutina Ekman & Urb.
Psychotria succulenta (Hiern) E.M.A.Petit
Psychotria suerrensis Donn.Sm.
Psychotria suffruticosa Müll.Arg.
Psychotria sulcata Wall. ex Hook.f.
Psychotria sulitii Merr. & Quisumb. ex Sohmer & A.P.Davis
Psychotria sumatrensis Ridl.
Psychotria sumbavana Miq.
Psychotria surianii Urb.
Psychotria surigaoensis Sohmer & A.P.Davis
Psychotria surinamensis Bremek.
Psychotria suterella Müll.Arg.
Psychotria sutericalyx Wernham
Psychotria sycophylla (K.Schum.) E.M.A.Petit
Psychotria sylvatica Blume
Psychotria sylvivaga Standl.
Psychotria symplocifolia Kurz

T 

Psychotria tacarcunensis Dwyer
Psychotria tahanensis Ruhsam
Psychotria tahitensis (Drake) Drake
Psychotria taitensis Verdc.
Psychotria talasensis Sohmer
Psychotria talbotii Wernham
Psychotria tanganyicensis Verdc.
Psychotria tapantiensis C.M.Taylor
Psychotria tapirapecoana Steyerm.
Psychotria tarapotensis Standl.
Psychotria tatamana Standl.
Psychotria tatei Standl.
Psychotria taupotinii F.Br.
Psychotria taviunensis Gillespie
Psychotria tawaensis Merr.
Psychotria taxifolia Bremek.
Psychotria tayabensis Elmer
Psychotria temehaniensis J.W.Moore
Psychotria temetiuensis Lorence & W.L.Wagner
Psychotria tenerior (Cham.) Müll.Arg.
Psychotria tenuicaulis K.Krause
Psychotria tenuiflora (DC.) ined.
Psychotria tenuifolia Sw.
Psychotria tenuinervis Müll.Arg.
Psychotria tenuipes Merr. & L.M.Perry
Psychotria tenuipetiolata Verdc.
Psychotria tenuirachis Valeton
Psychotria tenuis Merr. & L.M.Perry
Psychotria tenuissima E.M.A.Petit
Psychotria tephrosantha A.Gray
Psychotria tepuiensis (Steyerm.) Steyerm.
Psychotria ternata Bremek.
Psychotria ternatifolia W.N.Takeuchi
Psychotria tessmannii Standl.
Psychotria testacea Sohmer
Psychotria tetragonoides Fosberg
Psychotria tetramera Steyerm.
Psychotria teysmanniana (Miq.) Boerl.
Psychotria thailandensis Ruhsam
Psychotria thelophora Urb.
Psychotria thomensis G.Taylor
Psychotria thomsonii Hook.f.
Psychotria thorelii Pit.
Psychotria tillettii Steyerm.
Psychotria timbiquensis (Standl.) C.M.Taylor
Psychotria timonioides Fosberg
Psychotria tipuanensis Standl.
Psychotria toensis Britton & P.Wilson
Psychotria tolongoinensis A.P.Davis & Govaerts
Psychotria tomaniviensis A.C.Sm.
Psychotria tomentella (S.Moore) Zappi
Psychotria toninensis S.Moore
Psychotria tonkinensis Pit.
Psychotria tonsa (Cham. & Schltdl.) ined.
Psychotria torbeciana (Urb. & Ekman) Alain
Psychotria torrei Acuña & Roíg
Psychotria torrenticola O.Lachenaud & Séné
Psychotria torresiana Standl.
Psychotria toviana F.Br.
Psychotria transiens Wernham
Psychotria trianae Standl.
Psychotria tricephala (Müll.Arg.) Zappi
Psychotria trichanthera K.Schum.
Psychotria trichocalyx (Drake) Fosberg ex J.-Y.Mey., Lorence & J.Florence
Psychotria trichocarpa Valeton
Psychotria trichocephala Poepp.
Psychotria trichophora Müll.Arg.
Psychotria trichopodantha (Baill.) Guillaumin
Psychotria trichostoma Merr. & L.M.Perry
Psychotria trichostyla Müll.Arg.
Psychotria trichotoma M.Martens & Galeotti
Psychotria triclada E.M.A.Petit
Psychotria tricolor ined.
Psychotria trifida Ruiz & Pav.
Psychotria tripedunculata Sohmer
Psychotria tristis H.J.P.Winkl.
Psychotria trisulcata (Baill.) Guillaumin
Psychotria trivialis Rusby
Psychotria trujilloi Steyerm.
Psychotria truncata Wall.
Psychotria tsakiana C.M.Taylor
Psychotria tsaratananensis A.P.Davis & Govaerts
Psychotria tsiandrensis Bremek.
Psychotria tubuaiensis Fosberg
Psychotria tubulocubensis Govaerts
Psychotria turbinata A.Gray
Psychotria turbinella Müll.Arg.
Psychotria turboensis Standl. ex Steyerm.
Psychotria turrubarensis W.C.Burger & Q.Jiménez
Psychotria tutcheri Dunn
Psychotria tylophora Kurz

U 

Psychotria uahukensis Lorence & W.L.Wagner
Psychotria uapoensis Lorence & W.L.Wagner
Psychotria uberabana Müll.Arg.
Psychotria ulei Standl.
Psychotria ulviformis Steyerm.
Psychotria umbellata Thonn.
Psychotria umbellifera E.M.A.Petit
Psychotria uncumariana C.M.Taylor
Psychotria unicarinata (Fosberg) A.C.Sm. & S.P.Darwin
Psychotria unioensis Guillaumin
Psychotria urbaniana Steyerm.
Psychotria urceolata Steyerm.
Psychotria urdanetensis Elmer
Psychotria urniformis Steyerm.
Psychotria usambarensis Verdc.
Psychotria utakwensis Wernham

V 

Psychotria vaccinioides Valeton
Psychotria vaccinioidifolia Sohmer
Psychotria valerioana Standl.
Psychotria valetoniana Sohmer
Psychotria valetonii Hochr.
Psychotria valleculata A.C.Sm.
Psychotria van-hermanii Acuña & Roíg
Psychotria vanimoensis Sohmer
Psychotria vanoverberghii Merr.
Psychotria vareschii Steyerm.
Psychotria variegata Steyerm.
Psychotria vasiviensis (Müll.Arg.) Standl.
Psychotria vaupelii Whistler
Psychotria vellerea Müll.Arg.
Psychotria vellosiana Benth.
Psychotria velutina Elmer
Psychotria venezuelensis Steyerm.
Psychotria venosa (Hiern) E.M.A.Petit
Psychotria ventuariana Standl. & Steyerm.
Psychotria venulosa Müll.Arg.
Psychotria veracruzensis Lorence & Dwyer
Psychotria verdcourtii Borhidi
Psychotria verschuerenii De Wild.
Psychotria versteegii Deb & M.G.Gangop.
Psychotria verticissaxi Valeton
Psychotria vesciculifera C.M.Taylor
Psychotria vescula A.C.Sm.
Psychotria vestita C.Presl
Psychotria vichadensis Standl.
Psychotria victoriae Standl.
Psychotria vieillardii (Baill.) Guillaumin
Psychotria vietnamensis Ruhsam
Psychotria viguieri (Bremek.) A.P.Davis & Govaerts
Psychotria villosa Ruiz & Pav.
Psychotria vinkii Sohmer
Psychotria virgata Ruiz & Pav.
Psychotria viridialba Urb.
Psychotria viridibractea Steyerm.
Psychotria viridiflora Reinw. ex Blume
Psychotria viridis Ruiz & Pav.
Psychotria viticoides Wernham
Psychotria vitiensis Fosberg
Psychotria vittoriensis Müll.Arg.
Psychotria vogeliana Benth.
Psychotria voluta Elmer
Psychotria vomensis Gillespie
Psychotria vulpina Ridl.

W 

Psychotria waasii Sohmer
Psychotria wagapensis Guillaumin
Psychotria waimamurensis Merr. & L.M.Perry
Psychotria waiuensis Sohmer
Psychotria walikalensis E.M.A.Petit
Psychotria warburgiana A.P.Davis
Psychotria warmingii Müll.Arg.
Psychotria warongloaensis Hochr.
Psychotria wawrae Sohmer
Psychotria wawrana Müll.Arg.
Psychotria weberbaueri Standl.
Psychotria weberi Merr.
Psychotria welwitschii (Hiern) Bremek.
Psychotria wenzelii (Merr.) Merr.
Psychotria wernhamiana S.Moore
Psychotria wesselsboeri Steyerm.
Psychotria wiakabui W.N.Takeuchi
Psychotria wichmannii Valeton
Psychotria wilkesiana Standl.
Psychotria williamsii Standl.
Psychotria winitii Craib
Psychotria winkleri Merr.
Psychotria wollastonii Wernham
Psychotria womersleyi Sohmer
Psychotria wonotobensis (Bremek.) Steyerm.
Psychotria woodii Merr.
Psychotria woronovii Standl.
Psychotria woytkowskii Dwyer & M.V.Hayden
Psychotria wrayi King & Gamble
Psychotria wullschlaegelii Urb.
Psychotria wurdackii Steyerm.

X 

Psychotria xanthochlora K.Schum.
Psychotria xantholoba Müll.Arg.
Psychotria xiriricana Standl. ex Hoehne

Y 

Psychotria yagawensis Sohmer & A.P.Davis
Psychotria yapacanensis Steyerm.
Psychotria yapaensis Sohmer
Psychotria yapasensis Standl.
Psychotria yapoensis (Schnell) Verdc.
Psychotria yaracuyensis Steyerm.
Psychotria yarumalensis Standl. ex Steyerm.
Psychotria yatesii (Merr.) Merr.
Psychotria yavitensis Steyerm.
Psychotria yenii Sohmer & A.P.Davis
Psychotria yunnanensis Hutch.

Z 

Psychotria zepelaciana Standl.
Psychotria zevallosii C.M.Taylor
Psychotria zeylanica Sohmer
Psychotria zombamontana (Kuntze) E.M.A.Petit

External links
Psychotria L. Plants of the World Online
Accepted species Plants of the World Online

Psychotria